The 1913 Norwegian Football Cup was the 12th season of the Norwegian annual knockout football tournament. The tournament was open for 1913 local association leagues (kretsserier) champions, and the defending champion. Odd won their fifth title, having beaten the defending champions Mercantile in the final.

First round

|colspan="3" style="background-color:#97DEFF"|14 September 1913

|}

The rest of the teams had a walkover.

Second round

|colspan="3" style="background-color:#97DEFF"|21 September 1913

|}

Kvik (Fredrikshald) had a walkover.

Semi-finals

|colspan="3" style="background-color:#97DEFF"|29 September 1913

|}

Final

See also
1913 in Norwegian football

References

Norwegian Football Cup seasons
Norway
Football Cup